Pierre Dalphond (born May 1, 1954) is a Canadian lawyer and jurist who currently serves as a Canadian senator from Quebec (De Lorimier). He was appointed to the Senate on June 6, 2018.

Early life and career
Born in Joliette, Quebec, Dalphond was educated at the University of Montreal, Dalhousie University and the University of Oxford. He served as a law clerk at the Supreme Court of Canada and worked in the Privy Council Office. He is a lawyer and mediator by training, currently working at Stikeman Elliott. He was appointed to the Superior Court of Quebec in 1995 and to the Quebec Court of Appeal in 2002. He retired from the Court of Appeal in 2014.

Senate
From his appointment, Dalphond sat as a member of the Independent Senators Group. On May 21, 2020, Dalphond joined the Progressive Senate Group. His addition to the caucus brought the PSG's caucus to nine, and restored its official status.

Dalphond announced his intention to oppose use of the Emergencies Act during the "Freedom Convoy" protests, suggesting that it was a violation of section 8 of the Canadian Charter of Rights and Freedoms, which relates to "unreasonable search and seizure."

References

External links
 

1954 births
Living people
Canadian senators from Quebec
21st-century Canadian politicians
Independent Senators Group
Lawyers in Quebec
People from Joliette
Judges in Quebec
Université de Montréal alumni
Alumni of the University of Oxford